Susan Wides (born 1955) is an American photographer.

Her work is included in the collections of the Brooklyn Museum, and the Museum of Fine Arts Houston.

References

20th-century American women artists
21st-century American women artists
20th-century American photographers
21st-century American photographers
1955 births
Living people